The Nigeria Civil Service Union is a trade union representing workers in the Nigerian Civil Service.

The union was founded in 1978, when the government of Nigeria merged the following trade unions:

 Nigerian Civil Service Union
 Ministry of Defence Civil Employees' Union
 East-Central State Messengers' and Allied Workers' Union
 Government Coastal Agency Workers' Union
 Eastern Nigeria Internal Revenue Staff Association
 Eastern Government Stores Workers' Union
 Co-operative Inspectors' Union of Eastern Nigeria
 Eastern Nigeria Bailiffs' Union
 Association of Federal Produce Officers of Nigeria 
 Union of Telephone Operators' Attendants ECS
 Civil Service Technical Workers' Union
 Civil Service Technical Workers' Union of Nigeria
 Treasury Workers' Union of Eastern Nigeria
 South-Eastern State Treasury Staff Association
 North-Central State Civil Service Union
 Northern States Civil Service Union
 North-Eastern State Treasury Staff Union
 Federal Statistics Northern States Workers' Union
 Kano State Junior Civil Servants' Association
 Nigerian Federal Office of Statistics Workers' Union
 South-Eastern State Ministry of Education, Non-Teaching Staff and Allied Workers' Union
 Union of Western Nigeria Co-operative Inspectors

The union was a founding affiliate of the Nigeria Labour Congress.  By 1988, it had 205,397 members, but by 2005, this had fallen to 100,000.  It has had a long-running demarcation dispute with the Association of Senior Civil Servants of Nigeria.

References

Civil service trade unions
Trade unions established in 1978
Trade unions in Nigeria